List table of the properties and districts — listed on the California Historical Landmarks — within City and County of San Francisco, California. 

Note: Click the "Map of all coordinates" link to the right to view a Google map of all properties and districts with latitude and longitude coordinates in the table below.

Listings

|}

See also

List of San Francisco Designated Landmarks
List of California Historical Landmarks
National Register of Historic Places listings in San Francisco

References

 
 
 
List of California Historical Landmarks
.California Historical Landmarks
 California Historical Landmarks